The classification of all headaches, including migraines, is organized by the International Headache Society, and published in the International Classification of Headache Disorders (ICHD). The current version, the ICHD-3 beta, was published in 2013.

The first category within the ICHD is Migraine. Migraines in general are considered to be a neurological syndrome. It is estimated that 11% (303 million) of the global population, including 43 million Europeans and 28 million Americans, experience migraines.

Organization of migraine subtypes 
The ICHD-3 beta classification includes 6 main subtypes of migraine (ICHD-1: 7 main subtypes, ICHD-2: 6 main subtypes), most of which are further subdivided. Overall ICHD-3 beta distinguishes 29 migraine subtypes. The following table outlines the main subtypes and their ICHD-1, -2, -3 beta and ICD-10 codes.

Migraine without aura

Migraine without aura also referred to as a common migraine, (previously known as hemicrania simplex) is a specific neurological disorder characterized by recurrent, throbbing headaches that often affect one side of the head (i.e., it is unilateral), are of at least moderate pain intensity, and may cause nausea, phonophobia or photophobia. One defining characteristic of the common migraine is a lack of the visual disturbances known as an aura. The exact International Classification of Headache Disorders diagnostic criteria appear to the right.

Because migraine without aura can be hard to distinguish from an infrequent episodic tension-type headache, 5 attacks must have been experienced to meet the diagnosis. When migraine without aura is likely, but 5 attacks have not occurred, a diagnosis of probable migraine without aura (ICHD-2: 1.6.1) is warranted.

For children, the criteria are slightly less strict. For a pediatric diagnosis of migraine without aura, each attack need only last 1 hour to qualify. Also, pediatric migraines are frequently bilateral (on both sides of the head); unilaterality is not the typical pattern for migraineurs until late adolescence.
Migraine without aura can be diagnosed even if a patient has before experienced an aura.

One popular theory in migraine pathophysiology is the depolarization theory, which centres around the phenomenon of cortical spreading depression. However, it appears that this theory can not account for migraine without aura. Blood flow imaging has revealed no evidence of this phenomenon, though it has noted some changes in blood flow that are secondary to pain activation, particularly in the brainstem.

Research has revealed that nitric oxide (NO) and calcitonin gene-related peptide (CGRP) do have roles in the pathogenesis of a migraine without aura attack. Several studies have shown that migraines without aura develop in most subjects after the infusion of glyceryl trinitrate (GTN, well known as nitroglycerin), which is known to transport NO to tissues, but only in patients who have migraines. As well, inhibition of the nitric oxide synthase enzymes (NOS) by L-nitromonomethylarginine (L-NMMA) successfully reduced pain severity (in contrast with a placebo) in spontaneous attacks of migraine without aura.

In general, migraine without aura is more common than migraine with aura, with more frequent and more disabling attacks.

Migraine with aura

The second-most common form of migraine headache: the patient primarily has migraines with aura, and might also have migraines without aura. The International Classification of Headache Disorders definition is:

Migraine with brainstem aura
Migraine with brainstem aura (abbreviated MBA) (previously used terms: basilar artery migraine; basilar migraine; basilar-type migraine) is a subtype of migraine with aura in which symptoms clearly originate from the brainstem, but no motor weakness. When motor symptoms are present, the subtype is coded as 1.2.3 Hemiplegic migraine. Originally the terms basilar artery migraine or basilar migraine were used but, since involvement of the basilar artery is unlikely, the term migraine with brainstem aura is preferred in ICHD-3 beta. There are typical aura symptoms in addition to the brainstem symptoms during most attacks. Many patients who have attacks with brainstem aura also report other attacks with typical aura and should be coded for both 1.2.1 Migraine with typical aura and 1.2.2 Migraine with brainstem aura. Many of the symptoms like dysarthria, vertigo, tinnitus, hypacusis, diplopia, ataxia and decreased level of consciousness may occur with anxiety and hyperventilation, and therefore are subject to misinterpretation. Serious episodes of migraine with brainstem aura can lead to stroke, coma, and death. Using triptans and other vasoconstrictors as abortive treatments for migraine with brainstem aura is contraindicated. Abortive treatments for migraine with brainstem aura address vasodilation and restoration of normal blood flow to the vertebrobasilar territory to restore normal brainstem function.

Familial and sporadic hemiplegic migraine

Familial hemiplegic migraine (FHM) is migraine with a possible polygenetic cause—in fact, FHM can only be diagnosed when at least one close relative has it too. The patient experiences typical migraine with aura headache either preceded or accompanied with one-sided, reversible limb weakness and/or sensory difficulties and/or speech difficulties. FHM is associated with ion channel mutations.

There also exists the "sporadic hemiplegic migraine" (SHM), which is the same as FHM but with no close family members showing the symptoms.

Effecting a differential diagnosis between basilar migraine and hemiplegic migraine is difficult. Often, the decisive symptom is either motor weakness or unilateral paralysis, which occur in FHM and SHM. Basilar migraine can present tingling and numbness, but true motor weakness and paralysis occur only in hemiplegic migraine.

Menstrual migraines

It is well documented that migraine occurs nearly three times as often in women than in men, and is one of the top five most common disabling conditions in women. In over half these women, their headaches are strictly related to their menstrual cycle.

A clinical epidemiological study of women with migraine without aura in Parma and Pavia, Italy, revealed that 60% of those women experienced their attacks almost exclusively while menstruating, that 10.7% of their migraines first began at menarche (their very first "period", at puberty), and that 67% of them no longer had migraines while pregnant (and thus not menstruating).

This relationship was noted by the IHS in both versions of the ICHD, and particularly that this disorder fell under "migraine without aura". The ICHD-1 referred to this as menstrual migraine, noting that there were no strict guidelines for this diagnosis, but that at least 90% of a woman's attacks should occur within two days of the beginning or end of menstruation. When the ICHD-2 was published, explicit guidelines for a diagnosis of two distinct types of menstruation-related migraine were released, and appear to the right. However, because the nature of the relationship is still unclear, and because the IHS was still uncertain as to whether these were a subset of migraine without aura or a distinct class of migraine, the criteria were delegated to an appendix, while anticipating that they would appear within the main text in the next revision.

The ICHD-2 specifies two different forms of the previously dubbed "menstrual migraine": pure menstrual migraine without aura and menstrually-related migraine without aura. The sole difference between these diagnoses is the occurrence of headache attacks outside of the 5-day period described in the diagnostic criteria. If a woman experiences no attacks outside of this 5-day period, she may be diagnosed with pure menstrual migraine with aura; if she does experience other attacks, however, she may develop menstrually-related migraine without aura. This distinction is made solely for treatment purposes; a woman who only experiences migraines in that 5-day period is likely to benefit more from hormone therapy than a traditional migraine medication such as a triptan.

One defining characteristic of these menstrual migraines is that the woman does not experience an aura. Clinical research has shown migraine with aura to be unrelated to the menstrual cycle, and, in women who have headaches sometimes with aura and sometimes without, the presence or absence of aura does not appear to be related to the menstrual cycle.

As well as being split into two classes, menstrual migraines may have two different pathophysiologies, based on whether or not a woman is taking any oral contraceptives or another form of cyclical hormone replacement therapy. When these medications are being used, the regular hormonal changes that take place and result in ovulation and other events in the menstrual cycle are suppressed, and menstruation is instead the result of withdrawal from abnormal progestogen concentrations.

Menstrual migraines may also be linked to oestrogen withdrawal. Under the category of headache attributed to a substance or its withdrawal, the ICHD specifies the diagnostic criteria for oestrogen-withdrawal headache (8.4.3,  and ), and suggests that both that diagnosis and one of the menstrual migraine diagnoses be used in case of migraines related to oestrogen withdrawal occurring mainly at menstruation.

Abdominal migraine 
Abdominal migraine is a recurrent disorder of unknown origin, principally affecting children.  Sometimes early on, it can be misdiagnosed in an ER setting as appendicitis.  Episodes feature nausea, vomiting, and moderate-to-severe central, abdominal pain. The child is well between episodes. The International Classification of Headache Disorders definition is:

Most children with abdominal migraines will develop migraine headache in adult life; the two propensities might co-exist during the child's adolescence.

Treating an abdominal migraine can often be difficult; medications used to treat other forms of migraines are usually employed. These include Elavil, Wellbutrin SR, and Topamax.

In some cases, the abdominal migraine is a symptom linked to cyclic vomiting syndrome (CVS). There may be a history of migraines in the family of the patient.

Retinal migraine 

Retinal migraines are a subclass of optical migraines. Those affected will experience a scotoma—a patch of vision loss in one eye surrounded by normal vision—for less than one hour before vision returns to normal. Retinal migraines may be accompanied by a throbbing unilateral headache, nausea, or photophobia.

Not classified in the ICHD-2 under migraine

Acephalgic migraine 

Acephalgic migraine is a neurological syndrome. It is a variant of migraine in which the patient may experience aura symptoms such as scintillating scotoma, nausea, photophobia, hemiparesis and other migraine symptoms but does not experience headache. Acephalgic migraine is also referred to as amigrainous migraine, ocular migraine, ophthalmic migraine or optical migraine, the last three of which are misnomers.

People with acephalgic migraine are more likely than the general population to develop classical migraine with headache.

The prevention and treatment of acephalgic migraine is broadly the same as for classical migraine. However, because of the absence of "headache", diagnosis of acephalic migraine is apt to be significantly delayed and the risk of misdiagnosis significantly increased.

Visual snow might be a form of acephalgic migraine.

If symptoms are primarily visual, it may be necessary to consult an optometrist or ophthalmologist to rule out potential eye disease before considering this diagnosis.

References

External links 
ICHD-2
ICHD-2 Website
 ICHD-3 beta
ICHD-3 beta Website

Migraine